Francesco Pelle (born 4 February 1977), nicknamed Ciccio Pakistan, is an Italian mobster belonging to the Pelle 'ndrina of the 'Ndrangheta in Calabria. Until his arrest in 2021, Pelle was considered to be one of the most dangerous and wanted fugitives in Italy.

Biography
Pelle is the son of Domenico Pelle known as Micu 'U Mata, according to investigators, Ciccio Pakistan was the protagonist in the San Luca feud, the war between the Pelle-Vottari against the Nirta-Strangio. Pelle is accused of having ordered the murder of Giovanni Luca Nirta, head of the rival 'ndrina, who survived the attack, during which, however, Maria Strangio, wife of Nirta, lost her life, who fell under the blows of the Pelle-Vottari killers. It would be a response to the ambush, which occurred a few months earlier, on the day of his son's birth, due to which he is confined to a wheelchair due to a blow to the back. Revenge of the Nirta came in 2007 during the Duisburg massacre, where six people believed to be close to the Pelle were killed.

Capture and aftermath
In 2008, Pelle was arrested in a hospital in Pavia. Then in 2014, he was sentenced to life in prison. In 2018, Ciccio Pakistan was released from prison and was subjected to the obligation of residence in Milan pending the sentence, but following the confirmation of the life sentence he becomes a fugitive again. In March 2021, he was recaptured at a hospital in Lisbon, Portugal, where he was receiving treatment for COVID-19,  and then was extradited to Italy in September.

See also 
 List of members of the 'Ndrangheta
 List of most wanted fugitives in Italy

References

1977 births
Fugitives
Fugitives wanted by Italy
Fugitives wanted on murder charges
Fugitives wanted on organised crime charges
Living people
'Ndranghetisti
People from Locri